The Torneio Nunes Freire, was a tournament organized by CDB featuring the three main Maranhão clubs (Sampaio Corrêa, Moto Clube and Ferroviário), and three invited clubs América Mineiro, Santos, and São Paulo. All the matches was played at the Estádio Nhozinho Santos. Nunes Freire was the governor of the state of Maranhão, and was honored by naming the trophy.

Format 

The tournament was played in round-robin, the club that scored the most points at the end of five rounds was declared champion.

Matches

Final standings

Champion

References  

1976 in Brazilian football
Defunct football competitions in Brazil